Meshir 19 - Coptic Calendar - Meshir 21 

The twentieth day of the Coptic month of Meshir, the sixth month of the Coptic year. In common years, this day corresponds to February 14, of the Julian Calendar, and February 27, of the Gregorian Calendar. This day falls in the Coptic Season of Shemu, the season of the Harvest.

Commemorations

Martyrs 

 The martyrdom of Saints Basil, Theodore, and Timothy in Alexandria

Saints 

 The departure of Pope Peter II, the 21st Patriarch of the See of Saint Mark

References 

Days of the Coptic calendar